Móstoles-El Soto, is one of two railway stations serving the town of Móstoles in the Community of Madrid, Spain. It is situated on the Madrid-Móstoles-El Soto railway and is owned by Adif. The station currently serves as the western terminus of one of Madrid's commuter lines (Cercanías Madrid line C-5).

There are plans to extend the line across the Guadarrama valley to Navalcarnero. A contract was awarded to OHL, but work has been paralysed by the financial crisis.

The station which was constructed in the 1970s is in need of updating.

History 
At the end of the nineteenth century a narrow gauge railway was constructed between Madrid and Almorox via Mostoles. This railway closed in the 1960s, although it has been partly reopened as Cercanías Madrid line C-5 (an Iberian gauge line). Between Móstoles-El Soto railway station and Navalcarnero the track has been converted into a greenway (via verde) for cyclists and walkers.

References

Railway stations in Spain opened in 1976
Cercanías Madrid stations